Lady Nicholas Windsor (born Paola Louise Marica Doimi de Lupis, 7 August 1969) is the wife of Lord Nicholas Windsor, son of the Duke and Duchess of Kent.

Early life
Lady Nicholas Windsor was born as Paola Louise Marica Doimi de Lupis. She used this name as an undergraduate at Cambridge in 1989; by 1993 her entry includes the added 'Frankopan Šubić', while parenthetically including her original name for clarification. By the time of her marriage she was known as Princess Paola Doimi de Lupis Frankopan Šubić Zrinski. Her father is Louis Doimi de Lupis, who claimed to be a member of the Frankopan family. Her mother is Ingrid Detter, a barrister and professor of law at Stockholm University. The announcement of Lady Nicholas's marriage refers to her parents as 'Don' and 'Donna'.

She has one sister, Christina, and three brothers, Peter, Nicholas, and Lawrence.

Education and career
Paola Windsor was educated at St Paul's Girls' School and at Wycombe Abbey, where she was a William Johnston Yapp Scholar. She read Classics at Gonville and Caius College, Cambridge, where she was a Choral Scholar and took a Diplôme d'Etudes Approfondies (M.Phil. equivalent) at Paris IV, La Sorbonne in Philosophy, submitting a thesis in French entitled L'autorité de l'État (English: "The authority of the state").

As Paola Frankopan, she has written for Tatler, where she is a contributing editor, and for Vogue USA. She has published an introduction to the history of the Sanctuary of Trsat (Trsatska Sveta Kuća in Croatian).

Marriage and family
She met her husband, Lord Nicholas Windsor, at a millennium party in New York in 1999, and their engagement was announced on 26 September 2006. They married on 4 November 2006 in the Church of Santo Stefano degli Abissini in the Vatican City, following a civil ceremony on 19 October 2006 in a London register office, and she became Lady Nicholas Windsor. The bride wore a Valentino wedding gown. This was the first time a member of the British Royal Family married at the Vatican. A House of Commons Early Day Motion welcomed "the first overt marriage within the rites of the Catholic Church of a member of the Royal Family since the reign of Queen Mary I, and the first marriage of a member of the Royal Family to take place within the Vatican City State".

Lord and Lady Nicholas Windsor's first child, a son, Albert Louis Philip Edward, was born on 22 September 2007, at the Chelsea and Westminster Hospital, London. At birth Albert was 26th in the line of succession. An Early Day Motion in the House of Commons welcomed the baptism of Albert as the first royal child to be baptised a Catholic since 1688. Albert was baptised with  Catholic rites in the Queen's Chapel at St James's Palace in London.

Lady Nicholas gave birth to their second child, Leopold Ernest Augustus Guelph, on 8 September 2009 at the Chelsea and Westminster Hospital. He was baptised by Cardinal Angelo Comastri in St Peter's Basilica in the Vatican.

A third son, Louis Arthur Nicholas Felix Windsor, was born on 27 May 2014 at Chelsea and Westminster Hospital and like his brother Albert was baptised with  Catholic rites in the Queen's Chapel at St James's Palace in London.

References

External links
The family website La Casata dei Lupi, (Italian language), contains photos of Lord and Lady Nicholas, their first son Albert, and members of the Lupis family. Retrieved 26 September 2009.
Doimi de Lupis genealogy (Italian language) hosted by Società Genealogica Italiana – SGI (President- Marchese Marco Lupis) Retrieved 26 September 2009.

1969 births
Living people
Alumni of Gonville and Caius College, Cambridge
English people of Croatian descent
English people of Italian descent
English people of Swedish descent
English Roman Catholics
Frankopan family
Nicholas Windsor, Lady
People educated at St Paul's Girls' School
People educated at Wycombe Abbey
University of Paris alumni
Wives of younger sons of peers